Quarry is a rural unincorporated community in Marshall County, Iowa, United States.

History 
Quarry was laid out by the Le Grand Quarry Company in 1868. The mining community took its name from the nearby quarry. A post office was established at Quarry in 1869, and remained in operation until it was discontinued in 1909.

Quarry was the site of several limestone quarries. A railroad depot (on the North Western Railroad line), a schoolhouse, a general store, and a few houses were located in Quarry in 1912. During its heyday, between 60 to 150 laborers worked in the Quarry quarries.

Quarry's population in 1940 was 144.

References 

Unincorporated communities in Marshall County, Iowa
Unincorporated communities in Iowa
Populated places established in 1868
Mining communities in Iowa
Quarries in the United States